Tišenpolj is a small settlement in the hills north of Fara in the Municipality of Kostel in southern Slovenia. It has one permanent resident. The area is part of the traditional region of Lower Carniola and is now included in the Southeast Slovenia Statistical Region.

References

External links
Tišenpolj on Geopedia

Populated places in the Municipality of Kostel